Indian Rock Park is a  public park at 950 Indian Rock Avenue in the city of Berkeley, California, on the slope of the Berkeley Hills.  It is located in the northeast part of the city, about two blocks north of the Arlington/Marin Circle, and straddles Indian Rock Avenue.  The central feature of the park is a large rock outcropping on the west side of Indian Rock Ave. The larger portion of the park, on the opposite side of the street, has several much smaller rock outcroppings, grass fields, and a small barbecue and picnic area. The rock is composed of Northbrae rhyolite.

History

Volcanic in origin, Indian Rock is the largest of a number of similar rhyolite rock formations in the vicinity, including the smaller rocks in the portion of the park on the east side of Indian Rock Ave. For example, only one block farther up the east side of Indian Rock Avenue is the  Mortar Rock Park, which has its own complex of granite outcroppings.  Many remains of acorn-grinding pits carved into solid rock can be found in all these outcroppings, especially the aptly named Mortar Rock. These pits were made by the local indigenous people, the Huichin band of the Ohlones.

The land for Indian Rock Park was donated to the City of Berkeley by Duncan McDuffie, a real estate mogul, Sierra Club president and mountaineer, during Mason McDuffie's development of the Northbrae area. It was dedicated for park purposes in 1917. Indian Rock has long been used as a practice site for serious rock climbing, particularly bouldering. Members of the Sierra Club began climbing there regularly on weekends at least as early as the 1950s. Richard M. Leonard, the "father of modern rock climbing", and noted environmentalist David Brower, founder of Friends of the Earth, learned rock climbing and developed their mountaineering techniques at Indian Rock. Brower used this special knowledge to prepare training manuals during World War II, which proved critical in enabling the 86th Regiment of the U.S. Army to surprise the Germans at Riva Ridge in the North Apennines in Italy, the major action disrupting German lines in southern Europe.

Description
The top of the main outcropping, Indian Rock, has views that encompass sights from downtown Oakland and the University of California, Berkeley campus to the south; central Berkeley,  San Francisco Bay, and San Francisco to the west; and Marin County and Richmond, California to the northwest and north. All three of the bay's largest bridges can be seen from the rock. 

Indian Rock Path, a public walkway, connects the park to the intersection of Solano Avenue and The Alameda. The main part of Indian Rock itself has two sets of steps leading to its summit that were carved into the rock during the Depression years.

Indian Rock Park has been featured in the New York Times on at least two occasions, once each in 2010 and 2018.

References

External links

Indian Rock Park, City of Berkeley website

Parks in Berkeley, California
Berkeley Hills
Landforms of Alameda County, California
Rock formations of California
Climbing areas of California
Tourist attractions in Berkeley, California